Verkhotsenko is a rural locality (a village) in Bolshekarkalinksy Selsoviet, Miyakinsky District, Bashkortostan, Russia. The population was 1 as of 2010. There is 1 street.

Geography 
Verkhotsenko is located 23 km southeast of Kirgiz-Miyaki (the district's administrative centre) by road. Verkhny Gulyum is the nearest rural locality.

References 

Rural localities in Miyakinsky District